Plagal may refer to:
Plagal cadence (in music)
Plagal mode (in music)
Pro-Life Alliance of Gays and Lesbians (PLAGAL)